The Daai  are an ethnic group living in Chin State, Myanmar. The Daai consist of 32 Chin tribes, which have been registered by the Government of Burma since 1890. The recent Military Regime’s census mentions the Daai tribe as the 62nd of 135 tribes of Burma. Researchers refer to them as the Daai group in the ethnic survey book of Burma. The Daai Chin appear to be of Mongolian, Indo-Chinese, and Tibeto-Burman descent. The Daai people live in the Mindat, Paletwa, Matupi and Kanpetlet townships of Southern Chin State in Burma. There are more than 180 Daai villages with a total population of somewhere between 40,000 and 50,000. Their population makes the Daai-Chin the majority tribe of the Southern Chin Hills.

Daai History
The Daai land was an independent country until the British expedition in 1890, and later annexation in 1897 by the British Empire. The Daai language varies slightly between sub tribes. Their ethnic tribal symbol is the khuum (rocket tail dragon). The ling leih (Bulbophyllum refractum, one of orchid species) is their royal flower. About 99% of Daai are Christians.

Location

The Daai Chin inhabit a part of the Southern Chin State of Myanmar, located on the mainland of Southeast Asia. It is surrounded by China to the north and northeast, Laos to the east, Thailand to the east and southeast, India to the northwest, Bangladesh to the west and the Andaman Sea to the south. The country is divided into four topographical zones. The Eastern Shan Plateau is a highland region that merges with the Dawna and Tenasserim Yoma mountain ranges. The central belt zone covers the valleys of the Irrawaddy, Chindwin and Sittang rivers as well as a mountainous region to the north and a low lying delta to the south. The third region is the western mountain zone, also known as the Arakan Mountains, a series of ridges that start in the northern mountain area and extend to the southwestern corner. The Arakan coastal zone is a narrow alluvial strip lying between the Arakan Mountains and the Bay of Bengal.

The Daailand is situated in the southern part of the Chinland (Chin state) located on the western mountain zone of Myanmar. It is also located between north latitude 20˚ 42' and 21˚ 35', and between east longitude 93˚ 14' and 94˚ 8'. Daailand covers the west of Mindat Township, the northwest of Kanpetlet township, the northeast of Paletwa township and to the southeast of the Matupi township. The longest part of their land is about 120 miles (193 km) and the narrowest part is roughly 60 miles (96 km). The Daailand is mountainous and situated between 800 m–3200 m above sea level. Daailand has thousands of slope ranges of mountains, brooks, streams and a small river called the Lemro River. The biggest stream is Mone (မုန်းချောင်း). Many natural water courses flow through the mountain ranges running from north to south, forming valleys and gorges.

" The very word Dai is derived from the word Thai/ Daai, meaning peace, plain and harmony, and its root for adjective form is Do, Dam, and Daai, literally meaning plain or good for Do, valley or plain for Dam, and cool for Daai. Therefore, we can note that the term Daai as plain though the present location is hilly and mountainous. At present the term Daai is a collective name, of the inhabitants of Daailand in the southern Chin state of Myanmar. According to Thang Hleih, the word Daai represents the people who live peacefully, gently lovingly, harmoniously, generously and kindly. The word, therefore, stands for the people who are living inside the most interior part of southern Chin State. 
The Daai appears to be from Mongoloid stock and from Tibeto-Burman family as the other Chin tribes. At present there are 175 Daai villages with a total population between 40000 and 50000.  They have their own particular traditional cultures, way of life, language, practices and traditional beliefs, and societies as other tribes in Myanmar.

Daai people can be found in the west of Mindat township, the northwest of Kanpetlet township, the northeast of Paletwa township and the southeast of Matupi township, the southern part of the Chin state in Myanmar very close to Bangladesh and Northeastern India. The entire area is hilly made up of a series of ranges running from north to south which fortunately give sufficient food and rice to the inhabitants and their neighbors. The longest part of its land is about 120 miles (193 km) and the narrowest part is roughly 60 miles (96 km), and the area is far from each township between 60 miles and 90 miles. The Daailand is situated between 800ft to 3200 ft above the sea level. "

Population
The overall Daai population is estimated somewhere between 60,000 and 90,000. 15% of the total population (500,000) of the Chin State are Daai people. Some of the Daai people live in and around Myanmar and all over the world. Daai people are descended from Tibetan, Tibeto - Burma, Kuki - Chin - Naga, Kuki - Chin, Chin - Daai.

Politics
Daai land is divided into four parts within the southern Chin state: Kanpetlet, Mindat, Matupi and Paletwa townships. Today Daai land encompasses Chin state, Myanmar. The local government separated Daai land into Kanpetlet Daai, Mindat Daai, Matu Daai and Paletwa Daai.

Education
There are only basic educational institutions, such as middle schools (students from 5 to 14 years of age) in Daai lands. Basic primary school is available in almost all villages. Higher education is available only in a few villages. Today, Daai, and people are receiving further education in various Christian colleges such as in the capital cities of Yangon, Falam, Hakha, Mandalay, Kalay, Maymyo, Kyaukhtu, Pakokku and also America, India, and some others countries.

Health
There are government clinics and dispensaries in some villages, but there is no medicine in those dispensaries. People go to the nearest Burmese villages and the cities to buy medicine. There are no doctors in Daai land. Sometimes medical staff and nurses visit Daai lands. They occasionally administer government-provided vaccination to the Daai people.

Culture

Language
All Daai tribes speak the Daai Chin language, of the Sino-Tibetan family (not to be confused with the Daai language, belonging to the Tai-Kadai family). There are slightly different styles between the subtribes of Kanpetlet township and Matupi township. Despite this, the different dialects are usually mutually intelligible.

Villages
There are more than 180 villages in Daailand. Daai villages make up 13% of the 1,355 total villages in the Chin State. Villages range from 10 to 140 houses, the largest and most populated village in Daai land is Majar Innu Village in the Kanpetlet township, west of the central part of Daai land.

Religion

Approximately thirty years ago, Daai people practised animism. Since then, most Daai people have converted to Christianity within the last two decades. Currently about 99% of the Daai people are Christian. Two hundred years ago, the first American Missionary, Adoniram Judson, went to Myanmar (Burma) and gave his life to the Lord reaching out to Myanmar (Burma). He positioned the lay ministers to lead the believers in Myanmar (Burma) after he died. That was in Rangoon (Yangon), the Capital City of Myanmar (Burma). They could not reach to the Daai area at that time because it was very far and for many other reasons. The gospel reached to the Daai area in around 1970 by other missionaries. That was 156 years after Judson's arrival in Myanmar (Burma).

Shifting cultivation
Daai people practise shifting cultivation, known as ''Taungya" in Burmese and "Lou" in the Daai language. Cultivators cut and burn forests and raise agricultural crops for one to two years before moving on to another site, only returning to the original after 10 to 11 years.

The Daai people living in western part of Myanmar and southern part of Chin State have rich customs and traditions. Their traditions and rituals are associated with their shifting cultivation in the hills. The practice of shifting cultivation is deeply rooted in Daai culture. Shifting cultivation for the Daais is more than sustenance, it is a way of life, the foundation from which emerged their economic and social traditions.

In its early period, shifting cultivation provided food for the Daai. However, these days it serves as the economic mainstay for the Daai, providing money to buy clothes, attend school, and trade with their neighbours.

Economy
The Daai people cultivate rice, corn, millet, beans, peas, cucumber, pumpkin, gourd, egg plant, sweet potatoes, tomatoes, ginger, sesame and celery in their gardens or farms. Daai farmers cultivate at the beginning of monsoon season (the mid-April to June) and harvest crops in October and November. The cultivation method is dependent on monsoon rains.

Generally, Daai land is mostly used for slash-and-burn or shifting cultivation, with the least-developed regions inhabited by the indigenous hill tribes of Myanmar. Daai people earn their livelihood by shifting between cultivation (Taung Ya) and subsistence farming. Farming and gardening are only for their subsistence and personal consumption, transportation systems and markets are not developed in Daailand.

Daai people in Malaysia
Some Daai people migrate to Malaysia because their lives and political, cultural, and religious freedoms are threatened in Myanmar. There, the parents struggle for their daily bread as undocumented migrants, vulnerable to arrest for immigration offences, and are often subject to detention, prosecution, whipping and deportation for several months.

Daai refugees in Malaysia originate from Myanmar, where current conditions do not permit them to return. Daai refugees are scattered throughout Malaysia in places such as Johor Bahru, Ipoh, the Cameron Highlands, Kalang, Kajang, Rawang, and others.

There are no refugee camps in Malaysia. Instead, Daai refugees share living spaces in groups of up to 20 people, living in low-cost apartments, urban villages or housing estates near Malaysian homes. Many also live in makeshift camps in jungles near construction sites where they seek employment.

References 

 The study of Daai (Daai)people (Southern Chin State, Myanmar) by Dominique Thet Saw
 U Min Naing (B.A), National Ethnic Groups of Myanmar. Yangon: Swiftwinds Books, 2000.
 Committee of History and Customs Research, Kanpetlet Township: Chin Nationalities and Sub-tribes’ Customs Record. Kanpetlet: Limited Issue, 1984.
 Rosang, Ancient Chin History. Yangon: Limited Issue, 2005
 Myo Thant (Edit) et al. Myanmar Facts and Figures 2002. Yangon: Ministry of Information, 2002.
 The Daai people: The Apple of God's Eye by Shwekey Hoipang
 The Chin Hills: A History of the People, our dealing with them, Their Customs and Manners, and a Gazetteer of their Country Vol/ 1&2 by Bertram S. Carey and H. N. Tuck
 Burma Gazetteer:Northern Arakan District (or Arakan Hill Tracts ), Volume A,  Brown, Grant*# Captain G. C. Rigby, History of Operations: Northern Arakan and Yawdwin Chin Hills 1896–97 with A Description of the Country and Its Resources, Notes on the Tribes, And Dairy. Yangon: Government Printing Press, 1897.
 F. K. Lehman, The Structure of Chin Society: A Tribal People of Burma adapted to a Non-Western civilisation. Urbana: Illinois Studies of Anthropology, 1963.
 Lt. Col. Hla Min, Political Situation of Myanmar and Its Role in the Region. Yangon: Strategic Research Office-Defence Ministry, 2000.
 Lian H. Sakhong, In Search of Chin Society: A Study in Religion, Politics and Ethnic Identity in Burma. Copenhagen: NIAS, 2003.
 Senior Research Officer, Foreign Department Report on Chin Lushai Hills September. Aizawl: Tribal Research Institute, 1980.
 U Min Naing (B.A), National Ethnic Groups of Myanmar. Yangon: Swiftwinds Books, 2000.
 Mana Thang, A Short History of the Methodist Mission among the Daai people. Yangon: Unpublished (M.Div. Dissertation, MIT) 2000
 Dominique Thet Saw, Tree cultivated in Dai Land, http://daifamilylive.blogspot.com/2010/06/tree-cultivated-in-dai-land.html, (https://www.scribd.com/doc/32452982/)
 https://www.flickr.com/photos/naingshin/8745642410/in/photostream/
 The Statement of purpose of taking Master of Arts in Christian Ministry at Dallas Baptist University (DBU) By Timothy Ling Saw, 2013
 Mr. Naing, Ar, IN SEARCH OF DAAI WOMEN’S LIBERATION FROM FEMINIST BIBLICAL HERMENEUTICS(M.Th. Thesis.Yangon, (March, 2010), PP. 15,16

Ethnic groups in China
Ethnic groups in Myanmar
History of Inner Mongolia
Refugees in Malaysia